Paleri Manikyam: Oru Pathirakolapathakathinte Katha may refer to
 Paleri Manikyam: Oru Pathirakolapathakathinte Katha (novel), a 2009 best-selling Malayalam novel by T. P. Rajeevan
 Paleri Manikyam: Oru Pathirakolapathakathinte Katha (film), a 2009 film adaptation of the novel
 Undying Echoes of Silence, the English version of the novel written by T. P. Rajeevan himself